Jeremy Laidler (born 5 August 1989) is a former professional Australian rules footballer who played for the Geelong Football Club, Carlton Football Club and Sydney Swans in the Australian Football League (AFL).

Junior career
Laidler played junior football for the Doutta Stars, and TAC Cup football for the Calder Cannons. Laidler represented Vic Metro in the NAB AFL U18 Championships, and was the recipient of the Calder Cannons' best and fairest award for 2007.

AFL career

Geelong (2008–2010)
Laidler was recruited by the Geelong Football Club in the 2008 rookie draft with its second selection (No. 32 overall). At Geelong, Laidler was switched from playing forward (where he had scored 25 goals in his season with the Cannons) to defence. In 2009, he was promoted midseason to Geelong's senior list after some strong form for the club's VFL team and a string of long-term injuries in the backline allowed the Cats to make such a promotion. He made his senior debut against the Brisbane Lions, but only played that one game for the year. He was elevated to the senior list for the 2010 season, but again played only one senior game for the year. By the end of the 2010 season, Laidler had played two AFL games and 50 VFL games for the Cats.

Carlton (2011–2013)
Laidler was traded to the Carlton Football Club during the 2010 AFL Trade Week, in a deal which saw Geelong receive a third round draft pick (No. 54 overall) and saw the clubs swap second round draft picks (Geelong finishing with No. 37 overall, and Carlton finishing with No. 42 overall). Carlton had also been keen to recruit the defender at the end of 2009, and Laidler saw the move as a good opportunity to play more senior football, having been unable to break into the very strong Geelong defence. Laidler immediately became a regular in Carlton's defence, making his debut for the club in Round 1, 2011 against , and playing nineteen matches for the year. He played the first four games of 2012, before missing the rest of the season with a dislocated knee. In 2013, Laidler fell out of favour with new Carlton coach Mick Malthouse, not fitting into the new coach's defensive structure; he played only one senior match for the season, and requested to be traded at the end of the year, again seeking more greater opportunities for senior football. After being unable to find a suitable trade during the 2013 trade period, Laidler was subsequently delisted by Carlton.

Sydney (2014–2017)
After being delisted by Carlton, Laidler was signed by the Sydney Swans as a delisted free agent. Laidler played his first game for Sydney in the opening round of the 2014 AFL season against Greater Western Sydney. In round 8, 2016, Laidler played his 50th game for the club. At the conclusion of the 2017 season, he announced his retirement from AFL football.

Statistics
 Statistics are correct to the end of the 2017 season

|- style="background-color: #EAEAEA"
! scope="row" style="text-align:center" | 2009
|style="text-align:center;"|
| 37 || 1 || 0 || 0 || 3 || 6 || 9 || 0 || 2 || 0.0 || 0.0 || 3.0 || 6.0 || 9.0 || 0.0 || 2.0
|-
! scope="row" style="text-align:center" | 2010
|style="text-align:center;"|
| 37 || 1 || 0 || 0 || 5 || 11 || 16 || 2 || 4 || 0.0 || 0.0 || 5.0 || 11.0 || 16.0 || 2.0 || 4.0
|- style="background-color: #EAEAEA"
! scope="row" style="text-align:center" | 2011
|style="text-align:center;"|
| 15 || 19 || 2 || 1 || 195 || 105 || 300 || 110 || 42 || 0.1 || 0.1 || 10.3 || 5.5 || 15.8 || 5.8 || 2.2
|-
! scope="row" style="text-align:center" | 2012
|style="text-align:center;"|
| 15 || 4 || 0 || 0 || 27 || 20 || 47 || 16 || 5 || 0.0 || 0.0 || 6.8 || 5.0 || 11.8 || 4.0 || 1.3
|- style="background-color: #EAEAEA"
! scope="row" style="text-align:center" | 2013
|style="text-align:center;"|
| 15 || 1 || 0 || 0 || 3 || 1 || 4 || 1 || 5 || 0.0 || 0.0 || 3.0 || 1.0 || 4.0 || 1.0 || 5.0
|-
! scope="row" style="text-align:center" | 2014
|style="text-align:center;"|
| 11 || 19 || 3 || 4 || 125 || 142 || 267 || 61 || 32 || 0.2 || 0.2 || 6.6 || 7.5 || 14.1 || 3.2 || 1.7
|- style="background-color: #EAEAEA"
! scope="row" style="text-align:center" | 2015
|style="text-align:center;"|
| 11 || 23 || 2 || 3 || 181 || 180 || 361 || 79 || 37 || 0.1 || 0.1 || 7.9 || 7.8 || 15.7 || 3.4 || 1.6
|-
! scope="row" style="text-align:center" | 2016
|style="text-align:center;"|
| 11 || 16 || 0 || 0 || 97 || 106 || 203 || 44 || 35 || 0.0 || 0.0 || 6.1 || 6.6 || 12.7 || 2.8 || 2.2
|- style="background-color: #EAEAEA"
! scope="row" style="text-align:center" | 2017
|style="text-align:center;"|
| 11 || 3 || 1 || 1 || 21 || 22 || 43 || 10 || 9 || 0.3 || 0.3 || 7.0 || 7.3 || 14.3 || 3.3 || 3.0
|- class="sortbottom"
! colspan=3| Career
! 87
! 8
! 9
! 657
! 593
! 1250
! 323
! 171
! 0.1
! 0.1
! 7.6
! 6.8
! 14.4
! 3.7
! 2.0
|}

Personal life
Laidler's wife, Amber (born 1993), is a former Miss World Australia and currently a reporter for Seven News Sydney and Sunrise. The pair married on 3 November 2017. Amber gave birth to a baby boy in January 2022 nearly eight weeks premature.

References

External links

Geelong Football Club players
Carlton Football Club players
Sydney Swans players
Living people
1989 births
Australian rules footballers from Victoria (Australia)
Calder Cannons players
Doutta Stars Football Club players
Preston Football Club (VFA) players